John Sinisa is a Tongan rugby league footballer who played his club football as a  for the Balmain Tigers in the Premier League.

Background
Sinisa was born in Tonga.

Career
Sinisa has also appeared on several occasions for the Tonga national rugby league team with his most recent international games coming during the 2006 Federation Shield competition.

In 2010 he joined Stade Rodez Aveyron. He renewed his contract in 2011.

In August 2021 Sinisa was appointed coach for the Drummoyne DRFC Seniors.

References

Living people
Balmain Ryde-Eastwood Tigers players
Rugby league hookers
Tonga national rugby league team players
Tongan rugby league players
Tongan rugby union players
Year of birth missing (living people)